Luke Does the Midway is a 1916 American short comedy film featuring Harold Lloyd.

Cast
 Harold Lloyd as Lonesome Luke
 Snub Pollard
 Bebe Daniels
 Charles Stevenson - (as Charles E. Stevenson)
 Billy Fay
 Fred C. Newmeyer
 Sammy Brooks
 Harry Todd
 Bud Jamison
 Margaret Joslin - (as Mrs. Harry Todd)
 Dee Lampton
 May Cloy
 Mrs. Halliburton

See also
 Harold Lloyd filmography

References

External links

1916 films
1916 comedy films
Silent American comedy films
American black-and-white films
Films directed by Hal Roach
Lonesome Luke films
1916 short films
American silent short films
American comedy short films
1910s American films